Edgar County Airport  is a public use airport in Edgar County, Illinois, United States. It is located five nautical miles (5.8 mi, 9.3 km) north of the central business district of Paris, Illinois. The airport is included in the FAA's National Plan of Integrated Airport Systems for 2017–2021, which categorized it as a general aviation facility.

Although many U.S. airports use the same three-letter location identifier for the FAA and IATA, this facility is assigned PRG by the FAA but has no designation from the IATA (which assigned PRG to Ruzyne International Airport in Prague, Czech Republic).

Facilities and aircraft 
It has two asphalt runways: 9/27 has a surface measuring 4,501 by 75 feet (1,372 x 23 m). The second intersecting runway, designated 18/36, has a surface measuring 3,200 by 75 feet (975 x 23 m).

For the 12-month period ending August 31, 2019, the airport had 6,900 aircraft operations, an average of 19 per day: 99% general aviation and 1% air taxi. For the same time, there were 13 aircraft based at this airport: 11 single-engine, 1 multi-engine and 1 ultralight.

Airport Controversy 
On August 27, 2013 pilot Rusty Bogue was involved in a fatal crash during takeoff from the Edgar County Airport. He was flying a Cessna 421, dual-engine six seat aircraft. The aircraft experienced apparent engine trouble and struck a tree a mile from the end of the runway.

Bogue had been the victim of several issues instigated by the Edgar County Board, the Edgar County Airport Board, and the Airport Manager. There are numerous allegations of fraud, illegal contracts, and other abuses of power, including accusations involving the propriety of a concrete contract to extend the runway. This contract was placed with the concrete company owned by a now former chair of the airport advisory board.

On November 19, 2013 two aircraft, owned by the same owner as the Cessna 421 in which Bogue was killed, were damaged by incendiary devices placed on them. The planes had been spray painted with a threatening message to Bogue's father Rob.

The FAA and IDOT-Division of Aeronautics has stopped an airport improvement grant for three consecutive years due to alleged fraud in grant applications submitted by the former airport manager, Jimmy Wells, and the Edgar County Board. and

Accidents & Incidents
On August 27, 2013, a Cessna 421C crashed just after takeoff. The aircraft had engine issues on takeoff and impacted a tree a mile after takeoff. Witnesses reported that the aircraft's takeoff run appeared slower than normal, and the aircraft was found to have used the entire runway and traveled through two different 300-foot fields.
On November 19, 2013, two aircraft were destroyed by firebombs placed anonymously.

References

External links 
 Aerial photo as of 12 April 1998 from USGS The National Map
 

Airports in Illinois
Buildings and structures in Edgar County, Illinois